The Parliament of the Kabardino-Balkarian Republic is the regional parliament of Kabardino-Balkaria, a federal subject of Russia. A total of 70 deputies are elected for five-year terms.

Elections

2019

List of deputies
As of 26 December 2019
 Adib Abregov — United Russia
 Mihail Afashagov — United Russia
 Aslan Afaunov — United Russia
 Muradin Ahmatov — United Russia
 Aslan Altuev — Russian Ecological Party "The Greens"
 Fatimat Amshokova — United Russia
 Aslan Apazhev — United Russia
 Zaur Apshev  — United Russia
 Svetlana Arisheva — United Russia
 Astemir Ashabokov — Communist Party of the Russian Federation
 Dalhat Bajdaev — Communist Party of the Russian Federation
 Salih Bajdaev — United Russia
 Arsen Baragunov — United Russia
 Ljudmila Bechelova — United Russia
 Aslan Bekizhev — A Just Russia
 Vladimir Berdjuzha — United Russia
 Timur Berov — Liberal Democratic Party of Russia
 Artur Beshtoev — United Russia
 Vladimir Bezgod'ko — Liberal Democratic Party of Russia
 Raneta Bzhahova — United Russia
 Kasbolat Dzamihov — Communist Party of the Russian Federation
 Tat'jana Egorova — United Russia
 Nina Emuzova — United Russia
 Ahmed Esenkulov — United Russia
 Marita Halishhova — United Russia
 Liza Hasaitova — Communist Party of the Russian Federation
 Arsen Haupshev — United Russia
 Naur Hibiev — United Russia
 Dzhambulat Jerkenov — United Russia
 Marat Kalmykov — A Just Russia
 Elena Kansaeva — United Russia
 Tat'jana Kanunnikova — United Russia
 Murat Kardanov — United Russia
 Muradin Kardanov — Communist Party of the Russian Federation
 Sergej Karnysh —United Russia
 Al'bert Kazdohov — United Russia
 Husejn Kazharov — United Russia
 Vladimir Kebekov — A Just Russia
 Nadezhda Kireeva — United Russia
 Ol'ga Korotkih — United Russia
 Artur Kozhokov — United Russia
 Mihail Krivko — United Russia
 Muhamed Kudaliev — United Russia
 Zaurbek Kumalov — Communist Party of the Russian Federation
 Boris Mal'bahov — United Russia
 Konstantin Mamberger — Communist Party of the Russian Federation
 Alihan Mechukaev — United Russia
 Alisoltan Nastaev — A Just Russia
 Dmitrij Parafilov — United Russia
 Boris Pashtov — Communist Party of the Russian Federation
 Ljudmila Peshkova — United Russia
 Roman Ponomarenko — United Russia
 Viktor Popov — Communist Party of the Russian Federation
 Mihail Prytkov — United Russia
 Anatolij Rahaev — United Russia
 Vladimir Sekrekov — A Just Russia
 Safarbij Shhagapsoev — Russian Ecological Party "The Greens"
 Beslan Shogenov — United Russia
 Artur Tekushev — United Russia
 Timur Thagalegov — United Russia
 Adal'bi Tleuzhev — United Russia
 Ruslan Tokov — A Just Russia
 Husein Tumenov — United Russia
 Charim Vindizhev — United Russia
 Aleksej Vojtov — A Just Russia
 Jel'dar Zalihanov — United Russia
 Oleg Zalin — United Russia
 Salim Zhanataev — United Russia

References

External links
 Official site (in Russian)

Politics of Kabardino-Balkaria
Kabardino-Balkar
Kabardino-Balkar